Cham Khazam-e Do (also Romanized as Cham Khazām-e Do; also known as Chamkharām-e Do and Chamkhazām) is a village in Anaqcheh Rural District, in the Central District of Ahvaz County, Khuzestan Province, Iran. At the 2006 census, its population was 273, in 50 families.

References 

Populated places in Ahvaz County